Bianca Netzler may refer to:
Bianca Netzler (cyclist) (born 1974), New Zealand cyclist representing Samoa
Bianca Netzler (field hockey) (born 1976), Australian field hockey player